Maharaja is a 2011 Tamil-language film written and directed by Manoharan and produced by J. Ravi. The film stars Nassar, Sathya and Anjali. The music was composed by D. Imman with cinematography done by V. Lakshmapathy and editing by P. Sai Suresh.

Synopsis
Mahadevan is a middle-aged government employee who leads a very normal family life with his wife, son, and father. He lives a budget life, rides an old scooter, wears out-of-fashion clothes, and bears a sullen expression on his face for all the reasons above. He is unhappy with his present life, which is monotonous, and feels that he should live a modernized life which he has missed in his earlier life. In this day and age, with westernization overpowering everything else, he is constantly reminded of a flame that died out long ago, and it questions the purpose of his existence. Meanwhile, Aravind, who comes from America, has a modern lifestyle. He works in a software company in Chennai. Mahadevan happens to meet Aravind and learns that he is his nephew. Both of them become very close. Aravind helps Mahadevan enjoy the modern life, which causes Mahadevan's family to suffer greatly with his activities. However, Aravind turns a new lease of life when he falls for Priya. He changes his poor characters for his love. Aravind comes to understand the real life and feels that he would only spoil his uncle's life. How he helps his uncle through this midlife crisis forms the rest of the story.

Cast

Nassar as Mahadevan
Sathya as Aravind
Anjali as Priya
Saranya as Seetha
Anita Hassanandani
Karunas as Maadasamy aka OneTen
Kovai Sarala as Bujji
M. S. Viswanathan as Aravind's grandfather
Vennira Aadai Moorthy
Ajay Rathnam
M. S. Narayana as Subbu
Bayilwan Ranganathan as Traffic police officer

Production and release
The film was launched in March 2009 with Nassar being roped in by the debutant director Manoharan to star in the lead role, with the veteran actor allotting 35 days to shoot for the film, four times as lengthy as he would offer for other roles. Sathya, Anjali and Anita Hassanandani were roped in to essay other leading roles in the film while Karunas and Saranya were selected to play supporting roles. The film was briefly delayed before remaining portions were completed in Malaysia in a 40-day schedule by December 2010. The film was planned as a Tamil-Telugu bilingual film although the Telugu version never released. The film remained unreleased for a year, before hitting screens on 30 December 2011.

Critical reception
Rohit Ramachandran of Nowrunning.com rated it 2.5/5 stating that "Mahaaraja, a comic take on midlife crisis is refreshingly funny and Nassar keeps the laughs coming by providing justice to a well-written character.". With all the promotions, it was a box office flop.

Soundtrack
The film score and soundtrack for Maharaja was composed by D. Imman. The album consists of six tracks, featuring lyrics penned by Na. Muthukumar, P. Vijay, Snehan, Dr. Kiruthiya, Yugabharathi, and Viveka.

References

2011 films
2010s Tamil-language films